Street Without a Name (French: La Rue sans nom) is a 1934 French drama film directed by Pierre Chenal and starring Constant Rémy, Gabriel Gabrio and Paule Andral. It is based on the 1930 novel La Rue sans nom by Marcel Aymé.

Cast
 Constant Rémy as Méhoul
 Gabriel Gabrio as Fiocle 
 Paule Andral as Louise Johannieu
 Paul Azaïs as Manu
 René Bergeron as Schobre
 René Blech 
 Roger Blin 
 Gérard Dagmar as La Jimbre
 Max Dalban 
 Marcel Delaître as Johannieu
 Georges Douking 
 Fréhel as La Méhoul
 Enrico Glori as Cruseo
 Pola Illéry as Noa
 Marcel La Montagne as Le cordonnier
 Pierre Labry as Minche
 Pierre Larquey 
 Robert Le Vigan as Vanoël
 Charles Lemontier as Cloueur
 Teddy Michaud

References

Bibliography 
 Goble, Alan. The Complete Index to Literary Sources in Film. Walter de Gruyter, 1999.

External links 
 

1934 drama films
French drama films
1934 films
1930s French-language films
Films based on French novels
Films based on works by Marcel Aymé
Films directed by Pierre Chenal
French black-and-white films
1930s French films